The Ministry of Justice of the Republic of Latvia, established in 1918, is the leading state governing body in the field of justice and is the supreme authority for subordinate public administration institutions.

At the political level, it is run by the Minister of Justice, supported by the Secretary of State. The main tasks of the State Secretary are the organization of the development of sectoral policies and strategies, the implementation of sectoral policies, the management of the institution's administrative work and the organization of the implementation of ministry functions.

List of Ministers

Republic of Latvia (1918-1940)

Soviet Socialist Republic of Latvia (1940-1990)

Republic of Latvia (1990-present day)

See also 
 Justice ministry
 Latvijas Republikas Tieslietu ministrija (Ministry of Justice of Latvia)
 Latvijas Republikas tieslietu ministru uzskaitījums (List of Justice Ministers of the Republic of Latvia)
 Politics of Latvia

Justice ministries
Government of Latvia
Ministers of Justice of Latvia